"Outbound Plane" is a song written by American country music artists Nanci Griffith and Tom Russell. It was released on Griffith's 1988 album Little Love Affairs. Suzy Bogguss covered the song as the opening track and the second single from her 1991 album Aces. The song reached number 9 on the Billboard Hot Country Singles & Tracks chart in March 1992.

Music video
The "Outbound Plane" music video was filmed on location at the aircraft boneyard of Davis–Monthan Air Force Base in Tucson, Arizona. The video depicts Bogguss and her lover as central characters dancing around in the boneyard. The video was directed by American team directors Deaton-Flanigen, consisting of Robert Deaton III and George Flanigen IV.

Chart performance

Year-end charts

References

1991 singles
Suzy Bogguss songs
Song recordings produced by Jimmy Bowen
Liberty Records singles
Music videos directed by Deaton-Flanigen Productions
Songs written by Nanci Griffith
Nanci Griffith songs
1988 songs